The 15th Golden Horse Awards (Mandarin:第15屆金馬獎) took place on October 31, 1978, at Zhongshan Hall in Taipei, Taiwan.

Winners and nominees 
Winners are listed first, highlighted in boldface.

References

15th
1978 film awards
1978 in Taiwan